Nova Gora nad Slovensko Bistrico is a settlement in the hills north-northwest of Slovenska Bistrica in northeastern Slovenia. The area is part of the traditional region of Styria. It is now included with the rest of the Municipality of Slovenska Bistrica in the Drava Statistical Region.

History
Nova Gora nad Slovensko Bistrico became a separate village in 2000, when its territory was administratively separated from Kovača Vas, Slovenska Bistrica, and Zgornja Bistrica.

References

External links
Nova Gora nad Slovensko Bistrico at Geopedia

Populated places in the Municipality of Slovenska Bistrica